The 2019–20 Montana State Bobcats men's basketball team represents Montana State University during the 2019–20 NCAA Division I men's basketball season. The Bobcats, led by first-year head coach Danny Sprinkle, play their home games at Brick Breeden Fieldhouse in Bozeman, Montana as members of the Big Sky Conference.

Previous season 
The Bobcats finished the 2018–19 season finished the season 15–17, 11–9 in Big Sky play to finish in a three-way tie for fourth place. They defeated Idaho in the first round of the Big Sky tournament before losing in the quarterfinals to Eastern Washington.

On March 17, head coach Brian Fish was fired. He finished at Montana State with a five-year record of 65–92.

Roster

Schedule and results 

|-
!colspan=9 style=|Exhibition

|-
!colspan=9 style=| Non-conference regular season

|-
!colspan=9 style=| Big Sky regular season

|-
!colspan=9 style=| Big Sky tournament

References 

Montana State Bobcats men's basketball seasons
Montana State
Bob
Bob